Dudu's brush-furred rat (Lophuromys dudui) is a rodent belonging to the genus Lophuromys. It is native to the northeast of the Democratic Republic of Congo, from Kisangani to the eastern mountains of Garamba, Blukwa and Djugu to Irangi.

It has a short tail and is distinguished by its small skull, short ears and short hindquarters. It was split from the species L. flavopunctatus in 2002.

References

Lophuromys
Mammals described in 2002
Endemic fauna of the Democratic Republic of the Congo